Free Love is a 1930 Pre-Code film produced and distributed by Universal Pictures, directed by Hobart Henley and starring Conrad Nagel.

Cast
Genevieve Tobin - Hope Ferrier
Conrad Nagel - Stephen Ferrier
Monroe Owsley - Rush Bigelow
Bertha Mann - Helena
Ilka Chase - Pauline
George Irving - Judge Sturgis
Reginald Pasch - Dr. Wohlheim
ZaSu Pitts - Ada
Slim Summerville - Dennis
Sidney Bracey - Butler

Preservation status
A print of this film is in the collection of the Library of Congress.

References

External links

AllMovie/synopsis

1930 films
1930 comedy films
American comedy films
American black-and-white films
1930s English-language films
Films directed by Hobart Henley
Universal Pictures films
1930s American films